The B10 is a national road in northern Namibia, running from west to east from the Ohangwena Region to Rundu directly along the Angola Border.

References

Roads in Namibia